Maurilio De Zolt (born 29 September 1950 in San Pietro di Cadore, Province of Belluno) is an Italian cross-country skier who competed internationally from 1977 to 1997. His best known victory was part of the 4 × 10 km relay team that upset Norway at the 1994 Winter Olympics in Lillehammer, when he was 43 years old. He also won two silver medals in the Winter Olympics at 50 km (1988, 1992).

Biography
De Zolt also won six medals at the FIS Nordic World Ski Championships, including one gold (50 km: 1987), three silvers (50 km: 1985, 4 × 10 km relay: 1985, 1993), and two bronzes (15 km: 1985, 50 km: 1991).

At the Opening Ceremony for the 2006 Winter Olympics in Turin on 10 February, he and his 4 × 10 km relay teammates (Giorgio Vanzetta, Marco Albarello, and Silvio Fauner) who won the gold at the 1994 Winter Olympics in Lillehammer, were among the last carriers of the Olympic torch before it was lit by fellow Italian cross-country skier Stefania Belmondo. Eighteen years earlier, at the 1988 Winter Olympics in Calgary, De Zolt carried the Italian flag during the opening ceremonies.

De Zolt was formerly a firefighter, and once placed second in ladder climbing at the World Fireman Championships.

Cross-country skiing results
All results are sourced from the International Ski Federation (FIS).

Olympic Games
 3 medals – (1 gold, 2 silver)

World Championships
 6 medals – (1 gold, 3 silver, 2 bronze)

World Cup

Season standings

Individual podiums
 1 victory
 10 podiums

Team podiums
 3 victories
 9 podiums

Note:  Until the 1999 World Championships and the 1994 Olympics, World Championship and Olympic races were included in the World Cup scoring system.

References

External links
 
 

1950 births
Living people
People from San Pietro di Cadore
Italian male cross-country skiers
Cross-country skiers at the 1980 Winter Olympics
Cross-country skiers at the 1984 Winter Olympics
Cross-country skiers at the 1988 Winter Olympics
Cross-country skiers at the 1992 Winter Olympics
Cross-country skiers at the 1994 Winter Olympics
Olympic medalists in cross-country skiing
FIS Nordic World Ski Championships medalists in cross-country skiing
Medalists at the 1988 Winter Olympics
Medalists at the 1992 Winter Olympics
Medalists at the 1994 Winter Olympics
Olympic gold medalists for Italy
Olympic silver medalists for Italy
Olympic cross-country skiers of Italy
Sportspeople from the Province of Belluno